Jingyang County is a county under the administration of the prefecture-level city of Xianyang, in the central part of Shaanxi province, China.

Administrative divisions
As 2016, this County is divided to 13 towns.
Towns

Climate

References

 
County-level divisions of Shaanxi
Xianyang